Viggó Kristjánsson (born 9 December 1993) is an Icelandic handball player for TV Bittenfeld and the Icelandic national team.

He represented Iceland at the 2020 European Men's Handball Championship, 2021 World Men's Handball Championship and 2022 European Men's Handball Championship.

Having featured in senior handball in 2010, Viggó didn't play handball again until 2014. In the meantime he played football, playing 12 games in the Icelandic top tier, 43 games in the second tier and 23 games in the third tier, also featuring for the youth national teams in 2009–2010.

References

External links

1993 births
Living people
Viggó Kristjánsson
Sportspeople from Reykjavík
Grótta men's handball players
HSG Wetzlar players
Handball-Bundesliga players
Expatriate handball players
Icelandic expatriate sportspeople in Austria
Icelandic expatriate sportspeople in Germany
Icelandic footballers
Breiðablik UBK players
Íþróttafélag Reykjavíkur players